Megachile bicornis is a species of bee in the family Megachilidae. It was described by King in 1994.

References

Bicornis
Insects described in 1994